The men's triple jump event at the 1999 European Athletics U23 Championships was held in Göteborg, Sweden, at Ullevi on 29 and 30 July 1999.

Medalists

Results

Final
30 July

Qualifications
29 July
First 12 best to the Final

Participation
According to an unofficial count, 15 athletes from 12 countries participated in the event.

 (1)
 (2)
 (3)
 (1)
 (1)
 (1)
 (1)
 (1)
 (1)
 (1)
 (1)
 (1)

References

Triple jump
Triple jump at the European Athletics U23 Championships